Him Academy Public School (HAPS) is a private, co-educational, boarding and day school in Hamirpur, Himachal Pradesh, India. It is affiliated to the Central Board of Secondary Education.

Facilities 
The school has 34 rooms, labs for Physics, Chemistry, Biology and Information Technology (with computers), library, sports facilities and facilities for personality development of the students.

References 

Schools in Hamirpur district, Himachal Pradesh
Boarding schools in Himachal Pradesh
Private schools in Himachal Pradesh